The Time, the Place and the Girl is a 1946 American musical film directed in Technicolor by David Butler. It is unrelated to the 1929 film The Time, the Place and the Girl.

Plot
Steve and Jeff are about to open a nightclub when a man named Martin Drew who represents conductor Ladislaus Cassel claims that Cassel, who is living next door, objects to the club's music and that it disturbs his granddaughter, Victoria, an aspiring opera singer.

It turns out that Cassel himself is fine with the club but Vicki's grandmother Lucia is against it. Cassel also urges Vicki not to marry Andrew, her fiance, without being certain. After she meets Steve, she is attracted to him. Steve has a girlfriend, Elaine Winters, who is trying to persuade John Braden, a rich Texan, to finance the club. Elaine is upset about Vicki's presence and threatens to marry Braden.

Jeff and his girlfriend, singer Sue Jackson, hope to get a new show off the ground, but both Vicky's grandmother and Steve's girl Elaine keeps interfering. Cassel offers to finance the show provided Vicky can be in it. Lucia is livid until she reluctantly attends the show, at which she is charmed and gives her approval.

Cast

Soundtrack
 "A Rainy Night in Rio"'
Music by Arthur Schwartz
Lyrics by Leo Robin
Performed by Jack Carson, Dennis Morgan, Janis Page and Martha Vickers (dubbed by Sally Sweetland)
 "Oh, But I Do"
Music by Arthur Schwartz
Lyrics by Leo Robin
Sung by Dennis Morgan
 "A Gal in Calico" (Nominated for an Academy Award for Best Original Song of 1948)
Music by Arthur Schwartz
Lyrics by Leo Robin
Performed by Dennis Morgan, Jack Carson, Martha Vickers (dubbed by Sally Sweetland) and chorus
 "Through a Thousand Dreams"
Music by Arthur Schwartz
Lyrics by Leo Robin
 "A Solid Citizen of the Solid South"
Music by Arthur Schwartz
Lyrics by Leo Robin
Performed by Jack Carson and the Condos Brothers
 "I Happened to Walk Down First Street"
Music by Arthur Schwartz
Lyrics by Leo Robin

Box office
According to Warner Bros. records, it was the studio's most financially successful film of 1946–47, earning $3,461,000 domestically and $1,370,000 in foreign territories.

References

External links
 
 
 
 
 The Time, the Place and the Girl at The New York Times
 The Time, the Place and the Girl review at The New York Times

1946 films
1946 musical films
American musical films
Films directed by David Butler
Films shot in California
Warner Bros. films
1940s English-language films
1940s American films